A number of different units of measurement were used in Libya to measure length, mass, area, etc.  The metric system was adopted in Libya in 1927.

System before the metric system

A number of different units were used.

Tripoli and Cyrenaica

Length

Several units were used to measure length.  One pik was equal to 0.68 m as it was defined by metric equivalent.  Some other units are given below (Note: these units too were defined by metric equivalents):

1 handaze = 1 pik

1 palmo =  pik

1 draa = 0.46 m.
In Tripoli, draa was equal to 26.42 in and arbi draa (lesser pik) was equal to 19.029 in.

Mass

A number of units were used to measure mass.  One rottolo was equal to 0.512 8 kg as it was defined by metric equivalent.  Some other units are given below (Note: these units too were defined by metric equivalents):

1 oka = 2.5 rottolo = 1282 g

1 metical = 4.76 g

1 kharouba =  oka

1 dram =  oka

1 termino =  oka

1 uckin =  oka

1 mattaro = 42 oka

1 cantar = 100 oka.
In Tripoli, metical (73.6 grains) wnuas to measure gold and silver.

Area

Several units were used to measure area.  One pik2 was equal to 0.4624 m2 as it was defined by it metric equivalent.  Some other units were given below:

1 denum = 1600 pik2

1 jabia = 1800 pik2.

Capacity

Two systems, dry and liquid were used to measure capacity.

Dry

Several units were used to measure dry capacity.  One orba was equal to 7.5 L as it was defined by metric equivalent (According to some sources, one orba was equal to 7.692 L).  Some other units were given below:

1 nufsorbah =  orba

1 marta = 2 orba

1 kele = 2 orba

1 temen = 4 orba

1 ueba = 16 orba.

Following units were also used to measure dry capacity by weight:

1 oka =1282 g (defined by metric equivalent)

1 marta = 11–14 (oka of water)

1 kele = 2 marta.
In Tripoli, 1 cafiso (20 tiberi) was equal to 1.152 bushels.

Liquid

Several units were used to measure liquid capacity.  One barile was equal to 64.8 L as it was defined by metric equivalent (According to sources, one barile was equal to 62.4975 L.).   One bozze was equal to 1/24 barile.  One gorraf was equal to 1/5 barrile, and giarra was nearly equal to 50/71 barile.
Following units were also used to measure liquid capacity by weight:

1 oka = 1282 g (defined by metric equivalent)

1 gorraf = 9.75 oka (of water)

1 giarra = 58.5 oka.
In Tripoli, Mataro, for oil, was equal to 9.163 gal.

Marj (ancient Barca) and Fezzan

Barca and Fezzan had the same units as units in Tripoli.

References

Libyan culture
Libya